Sweetwater High School is a public high school located in Sweetwater, Texas, USA and classified as a 4A school by the UIL.  It is a part of the Sweetwater Independent School District located in north central Nolan County.   In 2015, the school was rated "Met Standard" by the Texas Education Agency. From 1912 to 1967, Sweetwater's high school was called "Newman High School."  In 1967, a new high school building was completed on the same grounds as Newman High School, and the Newman High School Building was razed.  The new building was called "Sweetwater High School."  Newman/Sweetwater High School is one of only a handful of high schools in the country with two alumni in the Pro Football Hall of Fame: Sammy Baugh and  Clyde "Bulldog" Turner.

Athletics
The Sweetwater Mustangs compete in these sports: 

volleyball, cross country, football, basketball, powerlifting, golf, tennis, track, baseball, soccer and softball

Sweetwater High School's football teams play in the Mustang Bowl, built in the 1930s by the Civilian Conservation Corps. Sweetwater's football tradition has produced 690 wins, fourth-most all-time in Texas class 3A rankings.

State titles
Football – 
1985(4A)
Boys Golf – 
1972(3A), 1973(3A), 2001(3A)
Girls Track – 
1984(4A)

Notable alumni
Willie Amos, CFL player of the Edmonton Eskimos
Sammy Baugh, Known as "Slingin'" Sammy Baugh, played college football for  Texas Christian University and professionally for the Washington Redskins (1937–1952).  Member of the Pro Football Hall of Fame.
John Layfield, WWE/WCW Wrestler
Charles Perry, Republican member of the Texas House from Lubbock, graduated from Sweetwater High School in 1980.
 Clyde "Bulldog" Turner, Played college football for  Hardin-Simmons in  Abilene and professionally for the Chicago Bears. Member of the Pro Football Hall of Fame.

References

External links
Sweetwater ISD website

Public high schools in Texas
Schools in Nolan County, Texas